Adam Frost (born September 1969) is a British garden designer known for his successes at the Chelsea Flower Show and as a presenter on the BBC's Gardeners' World.

He started his career working for North Devon Parks Department and then he moved to London, to work as a landscaper. His big break came when he worked with Geoff Hamilton at his garden at Barnsdale, Rutland.

In 2013 he was instrumental in setting up the Homebase Garden Academy and in 2014 became an RHS Ambassador. He is also an author and his book Real Gardens tells the journey of his award-winning Chelsea gardens. He has won seven gold medals at the Chelsea Flower Show. Frost discussed his life and career on BBC Radio 4's Saturday Live in April 2019. 

On BBC' Gardeners' World, in April 2022, Frost said that he had "downsized", with his family, to a smaller property.

References

External links
 

Living people
English gardeners
English television presenters
1969 births